Toleman Motorsport was a Formula One constructor based in the UK. It was active between 1981 and 1985 and participated in 70 Grands Prix.

Origins
The Toleman company was formed in 1926 by Edward Toleman for the purpose of delivering Ford cars from their factory in Old Trafford, Manchester. Within two years, the company moved to Dagenham, London, along with the Ford factory before settling in Brentwood, Essex. In the 1950s, Edward's son Albert took over the reins of the company. In 1966, Albert died leaving his elder son Ted as the chairman with the younger son Bob becoming joint managing director.

In the 1970s, Ted and Alex began their involvement in various car racing formulae in the UK. Ted was also noted for his involvement in off-shore powerboat racing. In 1977, Toleman Motorsport entered an eponymous team in British Formula Ford 2000. By 1978, they were running a March chassis for Rad Dougall in British Formula Two. During that year, Toleman MD Alex Hawkridge hired former Royale designer Rory Byrne but continued to use customer chassis in 1979, purchasing a pair of Ralts (RT2s) and engines from Brian Hart. Rad Dougall was joined by Brian Henton in the expanded team. Henton finished 2nd in that year's championship standings. The following year the team built their own chassis designed by Rory Byrne and John Gentry based on the Ralt. Powered again by Hart engines, running on Pirelli tyres, supported by BP and driven by Henton and Derek Warwick, the team finished 1st and 2nd in the European Formula 2 Championship.

Formula One

Toleman's entry to Formula One was announced in November 1980. Discussions took place with Lancia over the supply of a turbocharged engine, but the team decided to use a turbocharged version of the Hart F2 engine. By that time, Formula One was beginning to be dominated by turbo-powered cars, leaving the naturally aspirated engines lagging behind.

The Rory Byrne-designed Toleman TG181 was an overweight and underpowered car. Brian Henton and Derek Warwick failed to qualify until Henton made the cut for the Italian Grand Prix at Monza in September. Warwick also qualified only once; at the season-closing Caesars Palace Grand Prix in Las Vegas. In , upgraded TG181Cs were used by Warwick and newcomer Teo Fabi until the carbon-composite Toleman TG183 was ready in late August. The TG183 was used in only two Grands Prix (Italy and Las Vegas) but Warwick did record the first of Toleman's fastest laps in the Dutch GP in a TG181C running on low fuel and soft tyres.

In , the TG183B showed improved form thanks to a major update. Derek Warwick was retained, while Teo Fabi was replaced by Bruno Giacomelli. The budget increased as Toleman's current sponsor – Italian white goods manufacturer Candy – was joined by Iveco brand Magirus and BP. Warwick achieved Toleman's first points finish in the Dutch Grand Prix and scored again in the remaining three Grands Prix. These results placed Toleman 9th in the constructors' championship standings.

Ayrton Senna's debut

Warwick's performances were rewarded when he signed a contract with the factory Renault team, and his place was taken by the reigning British Formula 3 Champion and Formula One rookie (and future triple World Champion) Ayrton Senna, while Giacomelli's drive was taken by Venezuelan F2 driver and former dual Grand Prix Motorcycle World Champion Johnny Cecotto.

Senna's first ever Formula One Grand Prix was the 1984 Brazilian Grand Prix held at the Jacarepaguá Circuit in Rio de Janeiro on 25 March. Driving the 1983 car due to the TG184 not being ready, Senna qualified in 17th position (Cecotto qualified 18th). However, Senna's car was the first to retire in the 1984 season, after he was forced to pull out after 8 laps with turbo failure. Cecotto also retired with turbo failure 10 laps later.

Later in a rain-soaked Monaco Grand Prix which was round six, Senna finished in a close second place behind Alain Prost, whose McLaren MP4/2 was suffering from a brake balance problem that Prost reported was getting worse with each lap. In the wet conditions the McLaren's carbon front brakes were not generating heat and, as a result, were locking up with increasing regularity over the last few laps. This led the Frenchman, who had re-taken the lead on lap 15 following Nigel Mansell's crash, to drive slower and slower. The torrential conditions forced Jacky Ickx who was the clerk of the course to stop the race after 31 of the scheduled 78 laps. It was a controversial decision as Ickx had not consulted the race stewards before holding out the red flag, and one that stirred up a conspiracy theory. Prost's McLaren was powered by the Porsche designed TAG engine and Ickx was the lead driver for the factory backed Rothmans Porsche Group C Sports car team, and it was rumored that the Belgian had stopped the race to ensure the Porsche engined car won. The early stopping of the race resulted in much debate about whether Senna would have won. It was also reported by Toleman that Senna's suspension was on the point of collapse after an earlier incident and his consistent running over the curbs at the Chicane du Port, with the team believing that the damage was sufficient to cause his retirement within 2-3 laps of when competition was halted. Senna set the fastest lap of the race, his first in Formula One, but wasn't the quickest on the circuit at the time of the red flag. Catching both Prost and Senna was the Cosworth powered Tyrrell of West German driver Stefan Bellof who, while finishing third on the road, was later disqualified when the entire Tyrrell team was disqualified from the 1984 season due to technical infringements.

During practice for the British Grand Prix at Brands Hatch, Cecotto crashed heavily and broke both legs, ending his F1 career, though he would go on to have a touring car career. Toleman opted to run only one entry - Senna - in Germany at Hockenheim, the Austrian Grand Prix at the Österreichring and Dutch Grand Prix at Zandvoort.

However, before the Dutch Grand Prix, it emerged that Senna had signed a contract with Lotus despite having two years to run on his current deal. Although he had included a line in his Toleman contract allowing him to legally sever ties with the team should a better offer come along, Senna had failed to invoke this clause because he hadn't informed team principal Alex Hawkridge of the Lotus deal. He was subsequently suspended for the following race in Italy.

Toleman entered two cars again for the Italian Grand Prix at Monza, but local driver Pierluigi Martini - deputising for Cecotto - failed to qualify for the race. In Senna's car was Stefan Johansson, who qualified 17th fastest and finished in 4th place. When Senna returned after his "penalty", he and Johansson finished the season together.

Senna ended the year with three podiums during the season, finishing third at the British Grand Prix behind Niki Lauda's McLaren and Warwick's Renault, while he finished off the season with a third (after qualifying a then career best 3rd) in the final round in Portugal behind the dominant McLarens of race winner Prost and World Champion Lauda.

Early in the 1984 season, Ayrton Senna recorded his only failure to qualify for a Formula One Grand Prix. At round four of the championship, the San Marino Grand Prix at Imola, Toleman decided not to run their cars during Friday qualifying after to a dispute with tyre supplier Pirelli. Senna then suffered a fuel pressure problem in the wet Saturday session which left him stranded on the far side of the circuit between Tosa and Piratella. He was unable to make it back to the pits in time to qualify for the race, his best time of 1:41.585 being 13.068 seconds slower than the time defending World Champion Nelson Piquet had set in his Brabham-BMW to claim pole while being 2.637 seconds slower than 26th and last qualifier Jo Gartner.

Tyre supply problems
During the off-season, Toleman ran into difficulties over tyre supply and was only able to compete in  after Spirit experienced financial collapse, allowing Toleman to take over its Pirelli tyre supply. The roots of this situation lay in Toleman's decision to abandon Pirelli after the 1984 San Marino Grand Prix in response to Michelin and Goodyear's performance advantage. Due to the dispute, Toleman had opted to sit out the first day of qualifying at Imola and this, along with a fuel pressure problem on his Hart powered TG184 in the final session resulted in Ayrton Senna not qualifying for a Grand Prix for the only time in his career. Toleman had already aggravated Goodyear with the same behaviour (that time in favour of Pirelli) in Formula Two, so Michelin was the only alternative. When Michelin subsequently announced its withdrawal from F1 effective at the end of 1984, it left Toleman with bridges to mend.

The bridge with Pirelli was not mended in the off-season and as a result, it missed the first three Grands Prix. It was only after the team's new sponsor Benetton purchased Spirit Racing and transferred its Pirelli contract to Toleman did the team return, initially with only one entry. Johansson was to be retained with John Watson driving the second car, but the tyre supply issues prompted Johansson to drive for Tyrrell in Brazil as a replacement for the suspended Stefan Bellof, before replacing René Arnoux at Ferrari from round two in Portugal (where Ayrton Senna scored his maiden Grand Prix win). The sole remaining entry was taken by returnee Teo Fabi until an increased budget allowed a second car at the Österreichring for former Osella driver Piercarlo Ghinzani, who got the drive as Watson reportedly wanted payment for the full season, even though he would have only driven for less than half of that. Pole position at the Nürburgring in the hands of Teo Fabi was the highlight of the season.

That year's TG185 was the first carbon monocoque to be fabricated in-house at the Witney factory.

Change of ownership

In May 1985, Toleman acquired major sponsorship from the Benetton clothing company, which had previously sponsored Tyrrell and were at the time the major sponsor of the Alfa Romeo team. During the 1985/86 off-season, the knitwear firm purchased the team and it was renamed Benetton Formula prior to the 1986 season.  The team, through numerous sales, became the Renault factory team in 2016. In 2021, the team was renamed to Alpine F1 Team.

Toleman continued to be involved in motor racing, increasingly with management rather than as competitors. As of 2010 this includes management of the Australian Mini Challenge one make series by Toleman Motorsport.

Complete Formula One results
(key)

Notes
† – The driver did not finish the Grand Prix, but was classified, as he completed over 90% of the race distance.
‡ – Half points awarded as less than 75% of the race distance was completed.

References

Further reading
 Christopher Hilton: The Toleman Story: The Last Romantics in Formula 1 (2010)

External links
 MCZ.com
 Grandprix.com
 Forix.autosport.com

Formula One constructors
Formula One entrants
Formula Two entrants
British auto racing teams
British racecar constructors